Arthur Vagn Schmidt (born January 15, 1935) is a Danish sprint canoeist who competed in the late 1950s and early 1960s. He won a bronze medal in the K-1 10000 m event at the 1958 ICF Canoe Sprint World Championships in Prague.

Schmidt also finished fifth in the K-2 1000 m event at the 1960 Summer Olympics in Rome.

References

Sports-reference.com profile

1935 births
Canoeists at the 1960 Summer Olympics
Danish male canoeists
Living people
Olympic canoeists of Denmark
ICF Canoe Sprint World Championships medalists in kayak